Sikar - Delhi Sarai Rohilla Intercity Express is an intercity train of the Indian Railways connecting Sikar Junction in Rajasthan and Sarai Rohilla of Delhi. It is currently being operated with 14811/14812 train numbers on bi-weekly basis.

Service

The 14811/Sikar - Delhi Sarai Rohilla Intercity Express has an average speed of 44 km/hr and covers 291 km in  6h 40m. The 14812/Delhi Sarai Rohilla - Sikar Intercity Express has an average speed of 47 km/hr and covers 291 km in 6h 15m.

Route and halts

Coach composite

The train consists of 13 coaches :

 1 AC III Tier
 4 Sleeper Coaches
 3 Second Class sitting
 4 General
 2 Second-class Luggage/parcel van

Direction Reversal

Train Reverses its direction 1 times:

See also 

 Sikar railway station
 Delhi Sarai Rohilla railway station
 Delhi Sarai Rohilla–Sikar Express
 Rajasthan Sampark Kranti Express

Notes

External links 

 14811/Sikar - Delhi Sarai Rohilla Intercity Express
 14812/Delhi Sarai Rohilla - Sikar Intercity Express

References 

Rail transport in Delhi
Rail transport in Haryana
Rail transport in Rajasthan
Transport in Delhi
Intercity Express (Indian Railways) trains
Railway services introduced in 2015